Catherine Quittet (born 22 January 1964) is a French former alpine skier.

Career
During his career he has achieved 7 results among the top 3 in the World Cup. She competed in the 1988 Winter Olympics.

After years of competition, she studied at Emlyon Business School and manage her family's sports store dedicated to skiing.

World Cup results
Podiums

References

External links
 
 

1964 births
Emlyon Business School alumni
Living people
French female alpine skiers
Olympic alpine skiers of France
Alpine skiers at the 1988 Winter Olympics